The Rice Owls football statistical leaders are individual statistical leaders of the Rice Owls football program in various categories, including passing, rushing, total offense, and receiving, defensive stats, and kicking. Within those areas, the lists identify single-game, single-season, and career leaders. The Owls represent Rice University in the NCAA's Conference USA.

Although Rice began competing in intercollegiate football in 1912, the school's official record book considers the "modern era" to have begun in 1951. Records from before this year are often incomplete and inconsistent, and they are generally not included in these lists.

These lists are dominated by more recent players for several reasons:
 Since 1951, seasons have increased from 10 games to 11 and then 12 games in length.
 The NCAA didn't allow freshmen to play varsity football until 1972 (with the exception of the World War II years), allowing players to have four-year careers.
 Bowl games only began counting toward single-season and career statistics in 2002. The Owls have played in 5 bowl games since this decision, allowing players to accumulate additional statistics in the extra game.
 All of Rice's top 10 seasons by offensive yards and scoring have come since the 2001 season.

These lists are updated through the end of the 2016 season.

Passing

Passing Yards

Passing Touchdowns

Rushing

Rushing Yards

Rushing Touchdowns

Receiving

Receptions

Receiving Yards

Receiving Touchdowns

Total offense
Total offense is the sum of passing and rushing statistics. It does not include receiving or returns.

Total offense yards

Total touchdowns

Defense

Interceptions

Tackles

Sacks

Kicking

Field goals made

Field goal percentage

References

Lists of college football statistical leaders by team
Statistical leaders